Karimkunnam is a village in Idukki district in the Indian state of Kerala.

Demographics
 India census, Karimkunnam had a population of 12188 with 6220 males and 5968 females.

The Village of Karimkunnam falls in the Idukki District of the state of Kerala in India. The place has its own history which can be traced to 1000 A.D. As of 2001 India census, Karimkunnam had a population of 12188 people. The prosperity of karimkunnam starts in 1970’s with the arrival of high yield rubber plants. The introduction of rubber plants into the fertile land of karimkunnam proved a success. Farmers who were depend on paddy and other food crops turned to rubber cultivation. This revolution gave enough money for the local people which enabled them to provide better education for their children.

Institutions
 Police station Karimkunnam
 SSV Ayurvedic Clinic
 Cedar Hospital 
 St. Augustine's Higher Secondary School, Karimkunnam
 Karimbanakkavu Devi Temple
Kaithakkulangara Devi Temple
 Chakkiyallummala Devi Temple
 Little flower church
 St. Augustine's Church
 Govt.L.P.School Karimkunnam
 SNDP Temple karimkunnam.

References

Villages in Idukki district